Antoine Lejoly (born 26 March 1998) is a Belgian professional footballer who plays as a goalkeeper for RFC Liège.

Professional career
A youth product of Standard Liège, Lejoly signed with Beerschot on 28 May 2018. Lejoly made his professional debut with Beerschot in a Europa League Playoff 3-2 over Westerlo on 4 May 2019.

On 3 August 2022, Lejoly signed a three-year contract with RFC Liège.

References

External links
 
 ACFF Profile
 Beerschot Profile

1998 births
People from Verviers
Footballers from Liège Province
Living people
Belgian footballers
Belgium youth international footballers
Association football goalkeepers
Standard Liège players
K Beerschot VA players
RFC Liège players
Belgian Pro League players